Tanna (sometimes misspelled Tana) is an island in Tafea Province of Vanuatu.

Name
The name Tanna, first cited by James Cook, is derived from the word tana in the Kwamera language, meaning "earth".

Etymologically, Tanna goes back to Proto-Oceanic *tanoq, from Proto-Malayo-Polynesian *taneq, with the same meaning.

Geography
Its highest point is the  summit of Mount Tukosmera in the south of the island.

Siwi Lake was located in the east, northeast of the peak, close to the coast until mid-April 2000 when following unusually heavy rain, the lake burst down the valley into Sulphur Bay, destroying the village with no loss of life. Mount Yasur is an accessible active volcano which is located on the southeast coast.

History

Tanna was first settled about 400 BC by Melanesians from the surrounding islands. The glowing light of Mount Yasur attracted James Cook, the first European to visit the island, in August 1774, where he landed in an inlet on the southeastern tip of the island that he named Port Resolution after his ship HMS Resolution.

In the 19th century, traders and missionaries (chiefly Presbyterian) arrived. The Tannese stuck to their traditions more strongly than other islands; there remain fewer Christians in comparison with the other islands of Vanuatu.

Whaling vessels were some of the first regular visitors to the island in the nineteenth century. The first on record was the Rose in February 1804. The last known such visit was by the Sea Ranger in September 1871.

Tanna was not a principal site of World War II, but about 1,000 people from Tanna were recruited to work on the American military base on Éfaté. Exposure to First World living standards may have led to the development of cargo cults. Many have died out, but the John Frum cult remains strong on Tanna today, especially at Sulphur Bay in the south east and Green Point in the South West of the Island. The documentary Waiting for John (2015) by Jessica Sherry provides a history and overview of the current scene regarding these beliefs.

A secessionist movement began in the 1970s, and the Nation of Tanna was proclaimed on 24 March 1974. While the British were more open to allowing its holdings in Vanuatu to achieve independence, it was opposed by the French colonists and finally suppressed by the Anglo-French Condominium authorities on 29 June 1974.

In 1980, there was another attempt to secede, declaring the Tafea Nation on 1 January 1980, its name coming from the initials of the five islands that were to be part of the nation (Tanna, Aniwa, Futuna, Erromango and Aneityum). British forces intervened on 26 May 1980, allowing the island to become part of the newly independent nation of Vanuatu on 30 July 1980.

Tanna and nearby Erromango were devastated by cyclone Pam in mid-March 2015, with reports of an unknown number of deaths, complete destruction of the island’s infrastructure and permanent shelters, and no drinking water.  Following this, an El Niño-spurred drought further impacted on the people of Tanna.

Culture and economy

Population
It is the most populous island in Tafea Province, with a population of about 29,000, and one of the most populous islands in the country. Isangel, the provincial administrative capital, is on the west coast near the island's largest town of Lénakel.

Tanna is populated almost entirely by Melanesians and they follow a more traditional lifestyle than many other islands. Some of the higher altitude villages are known as kastom villages, where modern inventions are restricted, the inhabitants wear penis sheaths and grass skirts, and the children do not go to public schools. According to anthropologist Joël Bonnemaison, author of "The Tree and the Canoe: history and ethnography of Tanna," their resistance to change is due to their traditional worldview and how they "perceive, internalise, and account for the dual concepts of space and time."

John Frum movement

The island is the centre of the John Frum religious movement, which attracts tourist interest as a cargo cult.

The first John appeared at night as a spirit at a place called Green Point beach and told the people to return to their traditional way of life, or kastom. From that time kastom on Tanna has been seen as an alternative to the modernity encouraged by many missionary denominations. Yaohnanen is the centre of the Prince Philip Movement, which reveres Prince Philip, Duke of Edinburgh, the late husband of Queen Elizabeth II. The cult is examined by British writer Matthew Baylis in his 2013 book Man Belong Mrs Queen: Adventures with the Philip Worshippers.

Christian missionary John Gibson Paton served in Tanna in the mid 1800s. Cannibalism was practiced before Christianity swept the island. In the biography of Paton, the horror of the pagan practice of abusing and murdering disobedient wives is detailed.

Language
There are five main languages spoken on Tanna: the southern language of Kwamera and the South-Western language adjacent to the slopes of Tokosmera, of which there are many dialects spoken by very small groupings, constitute two of the languages. The remaining majority of Tanna islanders speak four dialects, being North Tanna in the northwest, Lénakel in the west-central area near Lénakel, and the middle bush dialect in the central plateau of the island, which is very close to Lenakel Whitesands in the northeast near Whitesands.

These are generally grouped into the Tanna languages family, which is a subgroup of the South Vanuatu languages, an Austronesian language branch. According to Ethnologue, each is spoken by a few thousand, and Lénakel, with about 16,000 speakers, is one of the languages of Vanuatu with the most speakers. Many people on Tanna also speak Bislama, which is one of Vanuatu's three official languages (together with English and French).

Economy
The island is one of the most fertile in Vanuatu and produces kava, coffee, coconut, copra, and other fruits and vegetables. Recently, tourism has become more important, as tourists are attracted to the volcano and traditional culture. To help preserve the integrity of culture as a tourism asset, only local people are permitted to act as guides. There are various types of accommodation on the island.

Cultural references
Five men from Tanna's Prince Philip Movement cargo cult, which considers Prince Philip, Duke of Edinburgh a god, were brought to the United Kingdom as part of the Channel 4 reality show Meet the Natives in 2007. Part of their itinerary included an off-screen meeting with the prince.

In An Idiot Abroad, Series 2, Episode 1, Karl Pilkington visited Tanna and discussed the Prince Philip Movement and met those who visited Windsor Castle.

In 2009 the Travel Channel aired Meet the Natives: USA, which brought five men from another group from Tanna to the United States. Their tribe reveres Tom Navy, an American World War II sailor who generations ago had taught the inhabitants to live in peace. The Tanna ambassadors were taken across, visiting five states, and eventually meeting former United States Secretary of State Colin Powell and verifying with him that the spirit of peace taught by Tom Navy lives on in then US President, Barack Obama. While visiting with a family on Fort Stewart, US Army Major-General Tony Cucolo conferred a World War II Victory Medal and an Asiatic-Pacific Campaign Medal upon the chief in representation of the contribution the people of Tanna in World War II.

Tanna, a film depicting the true story of a couple who decided to marry for love, rather than obey their parents' wishes, is set on the island, and was nominated for the Best Foreign Language Film at the 89th Academy Awards.

Transportation
The island is served by Whitegrass Airport.

References

Filmography
God is American, feature documentary (2007, 52 min), by Richard Martin-Jordan, on John Frum's cult at Tanna.

External links

 
 Pacific Island Travel page, with photos and cultural information
 Languages of Tanna, including language map
 Collection of photos from Tanna
 BBC News, Is Prince Philip an island god?, 10 June 2007, accessed 10 June 2007
 Virtual Tour of Volcanic Tanna Island

Islands of Vanuatu
Tafea Province
States and territories established in 1974
States and territories established in 1980
Cannibalism in Oceania
1974 establishments in Oceania
1980 establishments in Vanuatu